Gangula Kamalakar (born 8 May 1968) is an Indian politician serving as the Minister of BC Welfare, Food and Civil Supplies, and Consumer Affairs of Telangana state. He represents Karimnagar constituency as an MLA in the Telangana Legislative Assembly from the Telangana Rashtra Samithi.

Early life 
Kamalakar was born on 8 May 1968 in Karimnagar of present-day Telangana (then part of Andhra Pradesh) to Mallaiah and Laxmi Narasamma. He graduated in B. Tech in Civil engineering. He is married to Rajitha and the couple has a son and a daughter.

Career 
Kamalakar started his political career in 2000 when he was elected as a corporator in the Karimnagar Municipality. In 2009, he was elected as an MLA from Karimnagar constituency on a Telugu Desam Party (TDP) ticket. In 2013, he joined the Telangana Rashtra Samithi in the onset of Telangana movement and was re-elected in 2014 and 2018 election from the same constituency. Karimnagar was traditionally considered a stronghold of the Velama caste, however, Kamalakar who hails from the BC community, managed to get elected in three consecutive terms.

In September 2019, Kamalakar was included in the Second K. Chandrashekar Rao ministry, and was allotted the portfolio of B.C. Welfare, Food & Civil Supplies & Consumer Affairs. Kamalakar is a close aide of minister K. T. Rama Rao who fondly calls him "Karimnagar Bheemudu" and "Kamalakar Anna."

References

External links
 

1968 births
Living people
Telangana politicians
Telangana Rashtra Samithi politicians
Telugu politicians
People from Karimnagar
Telugu Desam Party politicians
Andhra Pradesh MLAs 2009–2014
Telangana MLAs 2014–2018
Telangana MLAs 2018–2023
State cabinet ministers of Telangana